is an action-adventure game developed and published by Capcom and developed by their US-based Production Studio 8 in 2003 for the PlayStation 2 video game console. This title is a sequel to Maximo: Ghosts to Glory. It is part of the Ghosts 'n Goblins franchise. It was re-released on the PlayStation Network for the PlayStation 3 in Europe on February 15, 2012.

Plot
The story of the game follows on from Maximo: Ghosts to Glory, with Maximo still searching for his lost love, Sophia. He is again accompanied by Grim (a Grim Reaper). However, their search is interrupted as a series of mechanical creatures start to attack villages and slaughter the village folk. These creatures are the Army of Zin, an ancient army powered by lost souls, who were supposedly locked in the vault of Castle Hawkmoor after the last battle with them 500 years ago. However, they are now free, due to the actions of the mysterious warlord, Lord Bane.

Gameplay
Maximo'''s gameplay is characterized by hack and slash combat and platforming, as well as an armour system where damage is reflected by loss of armour. Maximo begins the game with two levels of armour (full armour sans helmet), and can upgrade to three and four (with helmet and golden armour, respectively). Level one has Maximo reduced to boxer shorts.

Another element of gameplay is the Grim transformation, allowing the player to turn into a Grim Reaper for short periods of time, with the souls gathered from the Army of Zin. Grim is invulnerable, powerful, and a touch faster than Maximo. However, the time spent in this form is limited but can be extended through upgrades.

Maximo also receives bonuses from villagers that he saves from enemies in the game, and these rewards are anything from new armour to a word of advice.

Reception

The game received "favorable" reviews according to video game review aggregator Metacritic. GameSpot named Maximo the best PlayStation 2 game of January 2004. The Times gave it a score of four stars out of five, saying that it "has pace, style and replayability; and if it is not quite as inventive as Ratchet & Clank, what is?"  The Village Voice similarly gave it a score of eight out of ten, saying, "It always helps to have a sense of humor when collapsing paradoxes, and this Maximo does not miss." Likewise, Maxim'' gave it eight out of ten, saying, "It ain’t groundbreaking, but who cares? Drop trou and have some fun!"

References

External links
Official Japanese website  

2003 video games
3D platform games
Action-adventure games
Dark fantasy video games
Fantasy video games
Ghosts 'n Goblins
Hack and slash games
Video games about personifications of death
PlayStation 2 games
PlayStation 3 games
PlayStation Network games
Steampunk video games
Video game sequels
Video game spin-offs
Video games about robots
Video games developed in the United States
Video games scored by Tommy Tallarico